Immunoglobulin lambda locus, also known as IGL@, is a region on the q arm of human chromosome 22, region 11.22 (22q11.22) that contains genes for the lambda light chains of antibodies (or immunoglobulins).

Function 

Immunoglobulins recognize foreign antigens and initiate immune responses such as phagocytosis and the complement system. Each immunoglobulin molecule consists of two identical heavy chains and two identical light chains. There are two classes of light chains, kappa and lambda. This region represents the germline organization of the lambda light chain locus. The locus includes V (variable), J (joining), and C (constant) segments. During B cell development, a recombination event at the DNA level joins a single V segment with a J segment; the C segment is later joined by splicing at the RNA level. Recombination of many different V segments with several J segments provides a wide range of antigen recognition. Additional diversity is attained by junctional diversity, resulting from the random additional of nucleotides by terminal deoxynucleotidyltransferase, and by somatic hypermutation, which occurs during B cell maturation in the spleen and lymph nodes. Several V segments and three C segments are known to be incapable of encoding a protein and are considered pseudogenes. The locus also includes several non-immunoglobulin genes, many of which are pseudogenes or are predicted by automated computational analysis or homology to other species.

Genes 

The immunoglobulin lambda locus contains the following genes:
 IGLC@ – constant group
 IGLC1 – immunoglobulin lambda constant 1 (Mcg marker)
 IGLC2 – immunoglobulin lambda constant 2 (Kern-Oz- marker)
 IGLC3 – immunoglobulin lambda constant 3 (Kern-Oz+ marker)
 IGLC7 – immunoglobulin lambda constant 7
 IGLJ@ – joining group
 IGLJn – immunoglobulin lambda joining n
 IGLJ1, IGLJ2, IGLJ3, IGLJ6, IGLJ7
 IGLV@ – variable group
 IGLVm-n – immunoglobulin lambda variable n-m
 IGLV1-36, IGLV1-40, IGLV1-44, IGLV1-47, IGLV1-51, IGLV1-62
 IGLV2-5, IGLV2-8, IGLV2-11, IGLV2-14, IGLV2-18, IGLV2-23
 IGLV3-1, IGLV3-10, IGLV3-12, IGLV3-16, IGLV3-19, IGLV3-21, IGLV3-25, IGLV3-27 
 IGLV4-3, IGLV4-60, IGLV4-69 
 IGLV5-37, IGLV5-39, IGLV5-45, IGLV5-52
 IGLV6-57
 IGLV7-43
 IGLV9-49
 IGLV10-54
Ig lambda chain C regions is a protein that in humans is encoded by the IGLC2 gene.

References

Further reading